Vice Admiral Sir (Cecil) Aubrey (Lawson) Mansergh KBE, CB, DSC (7 October 1898 – 31 July 1990) was a Royal Navy officer who became President of the Royal Naval College, Greenwich.

Naval career
Born the son of Ernest Lawson Mansergh and younger brother of Admiral Sir Maurice Mansergh, Mansergh joined the Royal Navy in 1911 and then served in World War I. He became Commanding Officer of the cruiser HMS Cairo in 1936 and Commanding Officer of the cruiser HMS Aurora in 1937 and then Staff Officer (Plans) on the staff of the Commander-in-Chief, Home Fleet in 1939.

Mansergh also served in World War II commanding the cruiser  from 1942 and then commanding the cruiser HMNZS Leander from 1943 before becoming a Commodore on the staff of the Admiralty. He went on to be Commanding Officer of the aircraft carrier  in 1946, Vice-Controller of the Navy and Director of Naval Equipment in 1948 and Commander of the 2nd Cruiser Squadron in 1950. His last appointment was as President of the Royal Naval College, Greenwich in 1952 before retiring in 1956. He died in 1990 and is buried at St Margaret's Churchyard at Rottingdean in East Sussex.

References

1898 births
1990 deaths
Royal Navy vice admirals
Knights Commander of the Order of the British Empire
Companions of the Order of the Bath
Recipients of the Distinguished Service Cross (United Kingdom)
Admiral presidents of the Royal Naval College, Greenwich
Military personnel from Middlesex